Ustad Nissar Hussain Khan (1909–1993) was an Indian classical vocalist from the Rampur-Sahaswan gharana. He was a disciple and son of Fida Hussain Khan and after a long and illustrious career was awarded the Padma Bhushan in 1971. He was the court musician of Maharaja Sayajirao Gaekwad III at Baroda and was featured extensively on All India Radio. He was a specialist in Tarana. His most famous disciples are Ghulam Mustafa Khan and Rashid Khan.

Vocal style
Khansahib inherited a vast repertoire of well-known and obscure melodies from his forebearers. His rich, resonant voice was cultivated through decades of training. He embellishes the modal form of the ragas with flashes of "gamaks", "bol-taans" and "sargams". As an exponent of the "khyal" style, he renders "taranas" with distinction.

Lineage
Khan's most famous disciple was his grandnephew Rashid Khan. He trained Rashid in the traditional master-apprentice manner, first at his own residence at Badaun, Uttar Pradesh, and subsequently at the Sangeet Research Academy in Calcutta, where he spent the last years of his life.

Khansahib's gharana, the Rampur-Sahaswan gharana, owes its existence to the Senia traditions and has a revered lineage of classical vocalists such as Bahadur Hussain Khan, Inayat Hussain Khan, Fida Hussain Khan and Mushtaq Hussain Khan.

Partial discography

78rpm recordings (HMV: c.1938 onwards)

EP/LP recordings: HMV 1961

HMV 1972

Odeon Records 1990
  With Hafeez Ahmed Khan & Sarfaraz Hussain Khan (vocal support), Shakur Khan (sarangi) and Prem Ballabh (tabla)

References

1909 births
1993 deaths
20th-century Indian Muslims
Recipients of the Padma Bhushan in arts
Hindustani singers
20th-century Indian male classical singers
20th-century Khyal singers
Musicians from West Bengal
Recipients of the Sangeet Natak Akademi Award